An ACS bolt (also known as an anti-chop system) is a special type of bolt used in some Paintball markers. The purpose of the ACS bolt is to reduce the amount of chopping (when a paintball is pinched by the forward motion of the bolt, causing it to break) by using a system that detects when there is an obstruction in the chamber and brings the bolt back. Tippmann has a similar system on their model line called A.C.T., or "Anti-Chop Technology".

External links 
https://web.archive.org/web/20080405212249/http://www.pbreview.com/products/reviews/3201/
https://web.archive.org/web/20080527090102/http://www.spyder.tv/section/products/emarkers/acs/index.html

Paintball equipment